Nuriootpa is a town in South Australia and the major commercial centre of the Barossa Valley, about an hour's drive north of the state capital, Adelaide. The name of the town is reputed to be the local Aboriginal word for "meeting place".

Nuriootpa is situated at the north end of the Barossa Valley, near the Sturt Highway and has a population of over 6500 people, making it the largest town in the area. There are grape-vines growing on some of the buildings in the main streets, and vineyards surrounding the town. It is home to wineries including Penfolds, Elderton Wines and Wolf Blass.

History 
The first recorded Europeans to visit the locality, on 3 March 1838, were the exploration party of John Hill, John Oakden, William Wood, and Charles Willis, en route to the Murray River from Adelaide.

Since the 1930s, Nuriootpa has been cited as an example of inspired community development. The town's community owned and operated retail businesses have funded public facilities, including the Senior Citizens' Club, the swimming pool, the kindergarten and recreation areas. The short-lived progressive Adelaide movement, the Common Cause Movement, arranged a visit by future Prime Minister Ben Chifley to Nuriootpa in 1944 which led him, inspired by its approach, to promote the town as a model for community co-operation. The Adelaide architect Louis Laybourne-Smith prepared a plan for the town's recreation and education area, known as its 'War Memorial Community Centre' at that time. Much of this plan has been realised, including Laybourne-Smith's unusual 'fan-shaped' Olympic-sized pool.

The 1950 Australian Grand Prix, which was Australia's premier motor race of that year, was held on 2 January 1950 using the Nuriootpa Road Circuit, a temporary course utilising roads in and around the town of Nuriootpa. The race was won by Doug Whiteford driving a Ford V8 Special. The first race meeting to use the circuit had been held in April 1949.

On 21 March 1977 Queen Elizabeth II visited the town as part of an extended tour marking her Silver Jubilee.

The first stage of the 2014 Tour Down Under was held on 21 January 2014, starting from the town and finishing in Angaston. The 135 km stage was won by Simon Gerrans of Orica–GreenEDGE.

Governance
Nuriootpa is in the Barossa Council, although the northern outskirts are in the Light Regional Council. It is in the state electoral district of Schubert (and Light for the outskirts) and the federal Division of Barker.

Media
Nuriootpa was home to the short-lived Nuriootpa and District Community Diary (November 1955 – November 1956), a monthly magazine subtitled  ": monthly news bulletin of the Nuriootpa War Memorial Community Centre Inc". The main local newspaper covering the town is The Leader, published in Angaston.

Climate
Nuriootpa has a subtropical steppe climate as defined by the Köppen climate classification, experiencing warm, mostly dry summers and cool to cold winters with moderate rainfall.

Historical maxima and minima are 46.0 °C (114.8 °F) on 24 January 2019 and −4.5 °C (23.9 °F) on 15 June 2006.

See also

 Barossa Valley (wine)

References

Further reading
 H. C. Coombs, Trial Balance: issues of my working life Sun Books, South Melbourne 1981 p. 61
 A Township Starts to Live Common Cause, Adelaide 1945 (70 pages)

Towns in South Australia
Motorsport venues in South Australia
Barossa Valley
Australian Grand Prix